The U.S. state of Washington has several emergency operations centers (EOCs).

Federal

Federal Emergency Management Agency (FEMA) Region X Regional Response Coordination Center, Bothell (underground)
U.S. Army Corps of Engineers Emergency Operations Center, Seattle District
U.S. Department of Energy Hanford Emergency Operations Center, Hanford Nuclear Reservation

State

Washington State Emergency Operations Center, Camp Murray, Lakewood

County
Benton County EOC, Richland
Franklin County EOC, Port of Pasco
Grays Harbor County Emergency Coordination Center, Montesano
King County EOC, Renton
Pacific County EOC, South Bend
Snohomish County EOC, Everett
Spokane Emergency Coordination Center, Spokane
Tacoma-Pierce County EOC, Tacoma
Walla Walla EOC, Walla Walla

Local

City of Kirkland Emergency Operations Center, basement of City Hall
City of Seattle Emergency Operations Center, co-located with Fire Station 10, 5th Avenue, Seattle

Other
University of Washington EOC, UW Tower, Seattle

Footnotes

References

External links

Emergency management in Washington (state)